Elisabeth of Mecklenburg-Güstrow (3 September 1668 - 25 August 1738), was a German noblewoman member of the House of Mecklenburg and by marriage Duchess of Saxe-Merseburg-Spremberg (during 1692-1731) and Saxe-Merseburg (during 1731-1738).

Born in Güstrow, she was the tenth of eleven children born from the marriage of Gustav Adolph, Duke of Mecklenburg-Güstrow and Magdalene Sibylle of Holstein-Gottorp. From her ten older and younger siblings, eight survive adulthood: Marie (by marriage Duchess of Mecklenburg-Strelitz), Magdalene, Sophie (by marriage Duchess of Württemberg-Oels), Christine (by marriage Countess of Stolberg-Gedern), Charles, Hereditary Prince of Mecklenburg-Güstrow, Hedwig (by marriage Duchess of Saxe-Merseburg-Zörbig), Louise (by marriage Queen of Denmark and Norway) and Augusta.

Life
In Güstrow on 29 March 1692, Elisabeth married Prince Henry of Saxe-Merseburg, fourth surviving son of Duke Christian I. Two years later (1694), Henry received the town of Spremberg as his appanage, and took his residence there.

The marriage produced three children, of whom only one survived to adulthood:

Maurice, Hereditary Prince of Saxe-Spremberg (Spremberg, 29 October 1694 - Spremberg, 11 April 1695).
Christiana Fredericka (Spremberg, 17 May 1697 - Spremberg, 21 August 1722).
Gustava Magdalena (Spremberg, 2 October 1699 - Spremberg, 3 October 1699).

Elisabeth became Duchess of Saxe-Merseburg in 1731 after her husband inherited the main domains of the family as their last surviving male member. She died in Doberlug in 1738, aged 69, having survived her husband for one month. She was buried in Merseburg Cathedral.

References

|-

|-

Elisabeth
Elisabeth
1668 births
1738 deaths
Elisabeth
Daughters of monarchs